Kravikfjorden is a lake in the municipality of Nore og Uvdal in Buskerud county, Norway. It is a part of Numedalslågen.

References

See also
List of lakes in Norway

Nore og Uvdal
Lakes of Viken (county)